The 2016 South Carolina State Bulldogs football team represented South Carolina State University in the 2016 NCAA Division I FCS football season. They were led by 15th-year head coach Oliver Pough and played their home games at Oliver C. Dawson Stadium. They were a member of the Mid-Eastern Athletic Conference (MEAC). They finished the season 5–6, 5–3 in MEAC play to finish in a two way tie for third place.

Schedule

The game between South Carolina State and Bethune-Cookman, originally scheduled for October 8th, was postponed in advance of the arrival of Hurricane Matthew. The game was rescheduled for November 26 on October 7, 2016.
Source: Schedule

References

South Carolina State
South Carolina State Bulldogs football seasons
South Carolina State Bulldogs football